Cease to Begin is the second album by Band of Horses, released on October 9, 2007. This album solidified the band's sound and was a critical and commercial success, peaking at number 35 on the US Billboard 200 chart. The singles "Is There a Ghost" and "No One's Gonna Love You" appear on the album.

History
Following the release of their debut album, Everything All the Time, founding members Mat Brooke, Chris Early and Tim Meinig all left the band. Band leader Ben Bridwell recruited Joe Arnone (guitar and keyboards), Creighton Barrett (drums) and Rob Hampton (bass and guitar) as replacements, although Joe Arnone left the band prior to their 2007 tour. Robin Peringer (Modest Mouse - guitar), Matt Gentling (Archers of Loaf - bass) and Ryan Monroe (keyboards) joined the band for the tour, although only Monroe stayed for the recording of Cease to Begin. After the album's release he became a full band member.

The album debuted at number 35 on the U.S. Billboard 200 chart and was #47 on Rolling Stone's list of the Top 50 Albums of 2007. It was also a minor hit in Scandinavia, charting in Norway, Sweden and Denmark. Cease to Begin was released in Japan on July 23, 2008, by Tear Bridge Records. The Japanese version featured an enhanced video for "Is There a Ghost" plus three live bonus tracks, including a cover of Ronnie Wood's "Act Together", written by Mick Jagger and Keith Richards, which he recorded for his album, I've Got My Own Album to Do.

Ben Bridwell described the sound of Cease to Begin, "I guess the first record had some kind of country-ish leanings...I think there's maybe a little bit more of [that] feeling on it, a little more down-home...not so much indie rock."

The first track, "Is There a Ghost", was made available for download on the band's MySpace page on August 28, 2007, and made number 93 on Rolling Stone's list of the 100 Best Songs of 2007. The song became the band's first single to chart in the United States, peaking at #34 on the Billboard Modern Rock Tracks chart. The album's second single "No One's Gonna Love You" was featured as a free iTunes download, distributed at Starbucks locations. While not being released as a single, "Cigarettes, Wedding Bands" was featured in the tracklist of 2009 video game Guitar Hero 5.

Track listing

Track 4 is named after the German basketball player Detlef Schrempf who played for Seattle SuperSonics in the 1990s, although no mention of him is made in the song's lyrics.

Album credits
Band of Horses
Ben Bridwell - Lead vocals, guitar.
Rob Hampton - Guitar, bass guitar.
Creighton Barrett - Drums.

Additional musicians
Ryan Monroe - Keyboards.

Technical personnel
 Phil Ek - producer, mixing
 Jon Ashley - assistant engineer
 Julian Dreyer - assistant engineer
 Cameron Nicklaus - assistant engineer
 Dusty Summers - design
 Christopher Wilson - photography

Singles
 "Is There a Ghost" (August 28, 2007)
 "No One's Gonna Love You" (February 25, 2008)

Chart performance

Reception

Cease to Begin received a 78/100 rating on Metacritic and appeared on many "Best of 2007" lists:
Austin Chronicle, Doug Freeman, #1 album of 2007
Delusions of Adequacy, #9 album of 2007
Filter Magazine, #2 album of 2007
The A.V. Club, #5 album of 2007
Paste Magazine, #9 album of 2007
Consequence of Sound, #39 album of 2007

Cover versions
Cee-Lo Green has recorded a cover of "No One's Gonna Love You" for his 2010 album The Lady Killer.
Renee Fleming has recorded a cover of "No One's Gonna Love You" for her 2010 album Dark Hope.

Certifications

References

2007 albums
Band of Horses albums
Sub Pop albums
Albums produced by Phil Ek